Lomer was a medieval village on the South Downs which became deserted in the 16th century as a result of enclosure and the Black Death.

References

Former populated places in Hampshire